John McNeill (1872 – 4 June 1916) was a Scottish-born Australian politician.

His parents were commercial traveller John McNeill and Anne McKenzie. He arrived in New South Wales in 1888 and became a patternmaker, working for the Railways Department. In 1893 he married Mary O'Brien; they would have five children. He later worked as a publican. In 1902 he was elected to the New South Wales Legislative Assembly as the Labor member for Sydney-Pyrmont, transferring to Pyrmont in 1904. He served until his retirement in 1913, and died in 1916 at Hurstville.

References

1872 births
1916 deaths
Members of the New South Wales Legislative Assembly
Australian Labor Party members of the Parliament of New South Wales